The following is a list of books about K2, a mountain in the Karakorum Range between Pakistan and China, listed by expedition date:

1887 -  British - Younghusband
 Francis Younghusband, The Heart of a Continent, 1896, (Yakushi Y27)

1892 -  British - Conway
 Martin Conway, Climbing and Exploration in the Karakoram Himalayas, 1894, (Yakushi C336a)
 Oscar Eckenstein, The Karakorams and Kashmir Himalayas, 1896, (Yakushi E10)

1902 - International - Eckenstein and Crowley
 Charlie Buffet, Pionier am K2 - Jules Jacot-Guillarmod, 2012
 Aleister Crowley, The Confessions of Aleister Crowley, 1969
 Dr Jules Jacot-Guillarmod, Six Mois dans l'Himalaya, le Karakorum et l'Hindu-Kush., 1904, (Yakushi J17), ( edition only)

1909 -  Italian - Luigi Amedeo
 Filippo De Filippi, La spedizione nel Karakoram e nell'Imalaia occidentale, 1912, (Yakushi F71a), ( edition)
 Filippo De Filippi, Karakorum and Western Himalaya, 1912, (Yakushi F71b), ( / ( edition)
 Mirella Tenderini and  Michael Shandrick, The Duke of Abruzzi: An Explorer's Life, 1977

1929 -  Italian - Aimone di Savoia-Aosta
 Aimone di Savoia-Aosta and  Ardito Desio, La Spedizione Geografica Italiana al Karakoram, 1936, (Yakushi S670), ( edition only)

1937 -  British - Shipton
 Eric Shipton, Blank on the map, 1938, (Yakushi S432)

1938 American Karakoram expedition -  American - Houston
 Charles Houston and Bob Bates, Five Miles High, 1939, (Yakushi B165)

1939 American Karakoram expedition -  American - Wiessner
 Andrew Kauffman and William Putnam, K2; The 1939 Tragedy, 1992, (Yakushi K66)
 Fritz Wiessner, K2, Tragödien und Sieg am Zweithöchsten Berg der Erde, 1955, (Yakushi W152), ( edition only)
 Jennifer Jordan, The Last Man on the Mountain: The Death of an American Adventurer on K2, 2010

1953 American Karakoram expedition -  American - Houston
 Charles Houston and Bob Bates, K2, The Savage Mountain, 1954, (Yakushi H429a)
 Charles Houston, Bob Bates and George Bell, K2, 8611m, 1954, (Yakushi H430), ( edition only)

1954 1954 Italian Karakoram expedition to K2 -  Italian - Desio
 Mohammad Ata-Ullah, Citizen of Two Worlds, 1960, (Yakushi A284)
 Walter Bonatti, The Mountains of My Life, 2001
 Walter Bonatti, Processo al K2, 1985, (Yakushi B453), ( edition)
 Walter Bonatti, K2. La verità. 1954-2004, 2005, ( edition)
 Achille Compagnoni, Uomini sul K2, 1958, (Yakushi C328), ( edition only)
 Achille Compagnoni, Tricolore sul K2, 1965, (Yakushi C329), ( edition only)
 Achille Compagnoni, K2: conquista italiana tra storia e memoria, 2004, ( edition only)
 Ardito Desio, Ascent of K2. Second Highest Peak in the World, 1955, (Yakushi D167b), ( edition)
 Ardito Desio, Libro Bianco, 1956, (Yakushi D168), ( edition only)
 Mario Fantin, Sogno Visuto, 1958, (Yakushi F10), ( edition only)
 Lino Lacedelli and Giovanni Cenacchi, K2: The Price of Conquest, 2006, ( edition)
 Robert Marshall, K2. Lies and Treachery, 2009

1975 -  American - Whittaker
 Galen Rowell, In the Throne Room of the Mountain Gods, 1977, (Yakushi R366)

1978 -  American - Whittaker
 Cherie Bremer-Kamp / Cherie Bech, Living on the Edge, 1987, (Yakushi B558)
 Rick Ridgeway, The Last Step: The American Ascent of K2, 1980, (Yakushi R216)

1979 -  French - Mellet
 Bernard Mellet, K2. La victoire suspendu, 1980, (Yakushi M307), ( edition only)

1979 - International - Messner
 Reinhold Messner and Alessandro Gogna, K2, Mountain of Mountains, 1981, (Yakushi M340c), ( edition)

1986 
 John Barry, K2, Savage Mountain, Savage Summer, 1987, (Yakushi B135)
 Benoît Chamoux, Le Vertige de l'Infini, 1988, (Yakushi C125), ( edition only)
 Jim Curran, K2, Triumph and Tragedy., 1987, (Yakushi C405a)
 Anna Czerwińska, Groza wokół K2, 1990, (Yakushi C420), ( edition only)
 Kurt Diemberger, The Endless Knot: K2, Mountain of Dreams and Destiny, 1991, (Yakushi D234d), ( edition)

1993 -  American /  Canadian - Allison
 Jim Haberl, K2, Dreams and Reality, 1994

2008
 Graham Bowley, No way down - Life and death on K2, 2010
 Marco Confortola, Giorni di ghiaccio. Agosto 2008. La tragedia del K2, 2009, ( edition)
 Damien O'Brien, The Time Has Come: Ger McDonnell - His Life & His Death on K2, 2012
 Wilco van Rooijen, Surviving K2, 2010
 Freddie Wilkinson, One Mountain Thousand Summits, 2010
 Peter Zuckerman and Amanda Padoan, Buried in the Sky, 2012
 Pat Falvey and Pemba Gyalje Sherpa, The Summit: How Triumph Turned To Tragedy On K2's Deadliest Days, 2013

General literature on 'K2'
 Fulvio Campiotti, K2, 1954, (Yakushi C36), ( edition only)
 Jim Curran, K2, The Story of the Savage Mountain, 1995
 Kurt Diemberger and Roberto Mantovani, K2. Challenging the sky, 1995
 Heidi Howkins, K2: One Woman's Quest for the Summit, 2001
 Maurice Isserman and Stewart Weaver, Fallen Giants: A History of Himalayan Mountaineering from the Age of Empire to the Age of Extremes, 2008
 Dušan Jelinčič, Zvezdnate noči (Starry Nights), 2006
 Jennifer Jordan, Savage Summit: The True Stories of the First Five Women Who Climbed K2, 2005
 Jon Krakauer, Eiger Dreams: Ventures Among Men and Mountains, 1997
 Kenneth Mason, Abode of Snow, 1955, (Yakushi M214a), ( edition)
 Bernadette McDonald, Brotherhood of the Rope: The biography of Charles Houston, 2007
 Reinhold Messner, K2 Chogori. La grande montagna, 2004, ( edition)
 Greg Mortenson and David Oliver Relin, Three Cups of Tea: One Man's Mission to Promote Peace . . . One School at a Time, 2007
 Richard Sale, The Challenge of K2. A History of the Savage Mountain., 2011
 Mustansar Hussain Tarar, K2 Kahani, (in Urdu), 1994
 Ed Viesturs, No Shortcuts to the Top: Climbing the World's 14 Highest Peaks, 2007
 Ed Viesturs, K2: Life and Death on the World's Most Dangerous Mountain,  Aug 2010
 Mick Conefrey, The Ghosts of K2: The Epic Saga of the First Ascent,  April 2015

K2
Bibliographies of Pakistan